Itueta is a municipality in the state of Minas Gerais in the Southeast region of Brazil.

The city houses families of Pomeranian refugees from World War II.

See also
List of municipalities in Minas Gerais

References

Municipalities in Minas Gerais